Nicolas Louis Marcel Cozza (born 8 January 1999) is a French professional footballer who plays as a centre-back or left-back for German  club VfL Wolfsburg.

Club career
Cozza joined Montpellier in 2010 and signed his first professional contract on 14 June 2017. He made his professional debut for Montpellier in a 0–0 Ligue 1 draw against Lyon on 19 November 2017.

On 25 January 2023, Cozza signed a four-and-a-half year contract with Bundesliga club VfL Wolfsburg.

Personal life
Cozza is the grandson of the first ever captain of Montpellier, Jean-Louis Besson. He is of Italian descent from Calabria.

References

External links
 Profile at the VfL Wolfsburg website
 France profile at FFF
 
 
 
 

1999 births
Living people
Sportspeople from Hérault
Footballers from Occitania (administrative region)
French people of Italian descent
French people of Calabrian descent
French footballers
France youth international footballers
France under-21 international footballers
Association football defenders
Montpellier HSC players
VfL Wolfsburg players
Ligue 1 players
Championnat National 2 players
Championnat National 3 players
French expatriate footballers
Expatriate footballers in Germany
French expatriate sportspeople in Germany